Borriana could refer to:
 Borriana, Castellón, city on the Valencian Community, Spain
 Borriana, Piedmont, commune on the Piedmont, Italy.